The Biodesign Institute is a major research center known for nature-inspired solutions to global health, sustainability, and security challenges located on the Tempe campus of Arizona State University. The institute is organized into a growing number of collaborative research centers and laboratories staffed by scientists in diverse disciplines. It is currently led by Executive Director Dr. Joshua LaBaer, a personalized diagnostics researcher.

Overview
The Biodesign Institute performs biomedical and health research and develops solutions for environmental sustainability. The institute has more than 1300 faculty, staff and students, which include one Nobel Prize winner and National Academy member. The institute has attracted more than $760 million in extramural funding from competitive grant awards, filed 860 invention disclosures, nearly 200 patents, and 35 spinouts.

The Biodesign Institute is located on the Tempe campus of Arizona State University, a comprehensive multi-campus metropolitan university that is the largest in the U.S. by enrollment. The labs are housed in multiple buildings covering nearly 540,000 sqft.

COVID-19 response 
During the COVID-19 pandemic, the institute took a lead role and established a clinical testing laboratory, and processed nearly 500,000 tests. The institute has developed a saliva based testing and got emergency approval from FDA. The institute was named one of the Governor’s Celebration of Innovation’s Innovators of the Year for their work on saliva-based COVID-19 tests. The institute received a $6M state contract to develop a rapid 20-minute saliva testing.

Centers within the institute

ASU-Banner Neurodegenerative Disease Research Center 
The center is headed by Prof. Jeffrey Kordower. The center is pursuing new battleground tactics in the war against Alzheimer's and other neurodegenerative diseases.

Biodesign Center for Applied Structural Discovery 
The center is headed by Prof. Petra Fromme. The center is focused on developing new revolutionary techniques that reveal the structure and dynamics of biomolecules towards new visionary discoveries in medicine and energy conversion.

Biodesign Center for Biocomputing, Security and Society 
The center is headed by Prof. Stephanie Forrest. The center is focused on translating insights between computer science and biology, with a focus on understanding and mitigating malicious behavior in complex systems.

Biodesign Center for Bioelectronics and Biosensors 
The center is headed by Prof. Joshua LaBaer. The center is focused on enabling tools for biomedical and environmental health research, develop wireless personal sensors for mobile health solutions, and explore fundamental phenomena of nature at the single molecule level for next-generation detection technologies.

Biodesign Center for Bioenergetics 
The center is headed by Prof. Sidney M. Hecht. The center is focused on improved diagnosis and treatment for diseases caused by mitochondrial defects. The majority of these diseases are degenerative and affect children and young adults. Characteristics include suboptimal heart and muscle function, speech problems and developmental delays. Dysfunctional mitochondria are associated with Parkinson's disease, Alzheimer's disease, amyotrophic lateral sclerosis, ataxias, diabetes and cancer.

Biodesign Swette Center for Environmental Biotechnology 
The center is headed by Prof. Bruce Rittmann. The center is focused on environmental biotechnology by producing fundamental and applied scientific concepts, technologies, and field-leading people. Taken together, they improve a broad range of human-generated and natural environments, inform the human-environment relationship, and promote a more sustainable future.

Biodesign Center for Environmental Health Engineering 
The center is headed by Prof. Rolf Halden. The center is focused on safeguarding human health and critical ecosystems by detecting, minimizing, and ultimately eliminating harmful chemical and biological agents through the design and implementation of cost-effective engineering, industry engagement and public policy.

Biodesign Center for Fundamental and Applied Microbiomics 
The center is headed by Prof. Ferran Garcia Pichel. The center is focused developing an integrated understanding of microbiomes. Our goal is to establish general functional principles that can explain and predict the behavior of microbial communities for a variety of applications.

Biodesign Center for Health Through Microbiomes 
The center is headed by Prof. Rosa Krajmalnik-Brown. The center fundamental knowledge to develop microbe-based health interventions and diagnostics for better human health. Using fundamental microbiomes knowledge, we create methods to identify and track gut microbes and their products and develop microbial interventions for better human health.

Biodesign Center for Immunotherapy, Vaccines and Virotherapy 
The center is headed by Prof. Grant McFadden. The center focuses on understanding how microbial pathogens cause disease and the cellular and systemic mechanisms used by animal and human hosts to respond immunologically to pathogens and vaccines.

Biodesign Center for Innovations in Medicine 
The center is headed by Prof. Stephen Albert Johnston. The center focuses on to developing technologies that could transform health care. Our developmental process involves five steps. We first perform an extensive physical economic analysis of a potential intervention. Second, we analyze the logical, versus biological, opportunities. Third, we review the history of science in the area to identify flaws in analysis. Fourth, we determine if we have an inventive idea that would transform the area. Finally, we define a critical experiment to determine if our invention is viable. This is a teachable process that we impart to students and others. In addition, we require all our inventions to create products that everyone in the world could afford.

Biodesign Center for Mechanisms of Evolution 
The center is headed by Prof. Michael Lynch. The center focuses on the specific mechanisms that govern evolutionary change, starting with the building blocks of cells. Our goal is to decipher the general rules by which evolution proceeds in different lineages of organisms using experimental laboratory results and a mathematical framework. In essence, we are aiming to establish an entirely new field called evolutionary cell biology.

Biodesign Center for Molecular Design and Biomimetics 
The center is headed by Prof. Hao Yan. The center is designing biomimetic materials at the molecular level to develop a versatile biomimetic toolbox. Our immediate goal is to engineer an array of intelligent materials spanning scales from angstrom to macro. We are laying the foundation for a new field of research informally referred to as “angstrom technology.” The power of information-coded angstrom technology, a transformative extension of nanotechnology, lies in the potential to mimic nature's way of controlling molecular interactions with angstrom spatial resolution.

Pathfinder Center 
The center is headed by the Nobel prize winner Prof. Leland Hartwell. The center is focused on preparing educators and learners for the future by helping them find motivation and direction where education, health, technology, and sustainability meet.

Biodesign Center for Single Molecule Biophysics 
The center is headed by Prof. Stuart Lindsay. The center is focused on the confluence of molecular medicine and nanotechnology. Nanotechnology allows researchers to study the physical processes on which life is based using the simplest model systems – those that exist on the level of a single molecule or several molecules, but also to unravel fundamental biological processes on the cellular and tissue level. Doing so allows for a better understanding of gene regulation, molecular and cellular signaling, molecular transport in cells and tissue, and will lead to improved biosensors and other new technologies.

Biodesign Center for Sustainable Macromolecular Materials and Manufacturing 
The center is headed by Prof. Tim Long. The center is focused on integrating the concepts of green chemistry and sustainable engineering practices across the continuum of materials innovation to provide the products we need for a sustainable life. Efforts will utilize additive manufacturing processes and focus on multiphase systems. The center will embrace a “molecules to manufacturing” paradigm to catalyze innovation and an entrepreneurial spirit.

Virginia G. Piper Center for Personalized Diagnostics 
The center is headed by Prof. Joshua LaBaer. The center is focused on driving the discovery and development of biomarkers for the early detection of diseases. With better disease detection and earlier treatment, we strive to have a profound impact on decreasing mortality caused by various diseases including cancer and autoimmune diseases.

Leadership

Joshua LaBaer
Joshua LaBaer, a physician-scientist specializing in personalized diagnostics, was appointed interim executive director of the Biodesign Institute in January 2016. He became permanent executive director in March 2017.

Raymond DuBois
Raymond DuBois, a physician-scientist with expertise in translational cancer research, was appointed executive director of the Biodesign Institute on December 1, 2012.

Alan Nelson
Alan Nelson, an entrepreneur and a developer of a number of medical devices, was the executive director of the Biodesign Institute from March 2009 to July 2011.

George Poste
The institute was formerly led by George Poste, a scientist and policy maker with four decades of experience spanning academia, industry and government. Dr. Poste's experience in fostering scientific collaboration has shaped the institute's organization and has facilitated recruitment of international-caliber scientists to the institute.

Charles Arntzen
Charles Arntzen served as the founding director of the Biodesign Institute until May 2003, and as co-director of the Center for Infectious Diseases and Vaccinology of that Institute until 2007.

Landscape 
Designed by Ten Eyck Landscape Architects as a "green gateway" to the research facility set within the desert the landscape of the Biodesign Institute uses harvested stormwater and condensate to function as a riparian area. The 4-acre site aims "to create an environment that is about healing and sustaining life". TELA achieved this by replacing the prevalent asphalt with "permeable, vibrant, shade-giving regional gardens with plants used for healing purposes", using recycled water to feed these gardens, and most importantly "connecting people in an urban setting...with the natural beauty of our long ago altered Sonoran Desert". Beyond the gardens, the site features bike lanes, pedestrian malls, seatwalls, and bioswales that all function to bring people into contact with each other and nature. Upon completion, the project won an ASLA Honor Award in the General Design Category in 2009.

Gallery

References

External links
 The Biodesign Institute Official Website
 Ten Eyck Landscape Architects
 Green Source

Medical research institutes in the United States
Arizona State University
Research institutes in Arizona
Buildings and structures in Tempe, Arizona
Medical and health organizations based in Arizona
Research institutes established in 2004
2004 establishments in Arizona